"Thank You Lord" is a song by American contemporary Christian musician Chris Tomlin featuring American country music singer-songwriter Thomas Rhett and country duo Florida Georgia Line. The song was released as the third single from his thirteenth studio album, Chris Tomlin & Friends (2020), to Christian radio in the United States on August 13, 2021. Tomlin co-wrote the song with Corey Crowder, David Garcia, Thomas Rhett, and Tyler Hubbard. The single was produced by Brian Kelley, Chris Tomlin, Corey Crowder, and Tyler Hubbard.

"Thank You Lord" peaked at No. 11 on the US Hot Christian Songs chart, and No. 37 on the Hot Country Songs chart.

Background
On June 26, 2020, Chris Tomlin released "Thank You Lord" featuring Thomas Rhett and Florida Georgia Line alongside "Who You Are to Me" featuring Lady A, as the first two promotional singles from Chris Tomlin & Friends in the lead-up to its release, slated for July 31, 2020. On August 13, 2021, "Thank You Lord" impacted Christian radio in the United States as the third single from the album.

Composition

Commercial performance
"Thank You Lord" debuted at No. 15 on the US Hot Christian Songs chart dated July 11, 2020, concurrently charting at No. 2 on the Christian Digital Song Sales chart. The song peaked at No. 11 and spent a total of twenty weeks appearing on the chart.

Music video
The music video of "Thank You Lord" was published via Chris Tomlin's YouTube channel on July 15, 2020.

Live performances
On August 19, 2020, Chris Tomlin performed "Thank You Lord" alongside Thomas Rhett and Florida Georgia Line on The Late Late Show with James Corden. On August 25, 2020, Chris Tomlin performed "Thank You Lord" alongside Thomas Rhett and Florida Georgia Line on Today with Hoda & Jenna.

Personnel
Adapted from AllMusic.
 Adam Ayan — mastering
 David Cook — mixing assistant
 Corey Crowder — producer
 Florida Georgia Line — featured artist, vocals
 Tyler Hubbard — producer
 Jeff Juliano — mixing
 Brian Kelley — producer
 Thomas Rhett — featured artist, vocals
 Chris Tomlin — primary artist, producer

Charts

Weekly charts

Year-end charts

Release history

References

External links
  on PraiseCharts

 

2020 songs
2021 singles
Chris Tomlin songs
Thomas Rhett songs
Florida Georgia Line songs